Bardasly (Bärźäsle) is a rural locality (a selo) in Chekmagushevsky District, Bashkortostan, Russia. The population was 120 as of 2010. There are 4 streets.

Geography 
Bardasly is located 31 km southeast of Chekmagush (the district's administrative centre) by road. Staroabzanovo is the nearest rural locality.

References 

Rural localities in Chekmagushevsky District